Plasmodium pulmophilium is a parasite of the genus Plasmodium subgenus Vinckeia. Like all Plasmodium species, P. pulmophilium has both vertebrate and insect hosts. The vertebrate hosts for this parasite are mammals.

Description
Plasmodium pulmophilium was described from the blood of flying squirrels in the Ivory Coast.

Distribution
Plasmodium pulmophilium has only been described in the Ivory Coast.

Hosts
Plasmodium pulmophilium has only been described from the blood of Anomalurus peli. It is not known if it causes disease in this host.

References

pulmophilium